Incoming is the debut album by the British synthpop band Blue October.

Track listing
 Intro
 Where I Stand
 When You leave
 Over
 Safe
 Force
 Believe
 Incoming
 Now Is the Day
 True to Me
 Slowburn

Personnel
 Barney Miller: Vocals
 Glen Wisbey: Keyboards & Programming
 Matthew Davies: Guitars
 Emma Spiers: Backing Vocals on Safe

Details
All songs by Glen Wisbey & Barney Miller

1998 debut albums
Blue October (British band) albums